Hypochondriac is the second studio album by American musician Brakence, released on December 2, 2022, via Columbia Records and Sony Music. It was preceded by the singles "Argyle", "CBD", "Venus Fly Trap", "Caffeine", and "Bugging!".

Background
Brakence began plans for his album shortly after the release of his 2020 album Punk2. On September 23, 2021, after a period of silence, Brakence posted a video titled "bloomtodeath" onto his social media accounts, leading many fans to believe this to be the title of a new album and that new material would be coming soon. On October 8, he released "Argyle", his first single in over a year at the time. He then released a second single, "CBD", on January 21, 2022. On July 8, he released "Venus Fly Trap", the album's third single. On September 9, he released its fourth single "Caffeine". The album's title was also officially revealed to be Hypochondriac at the end of the song's music video. On November 14, 2022, Brakence revealed the cover art for Hypochondriac, and announced that it would be released on December 2. On November 18, he released its fifth and final single "Bugging!", as well as the album's track listing.

Brakence embarked on the Hypochondriac Tour to support the album. The tour began on November 26, 2022 in Cleveland, Ohio and concluded on December 20 in Brooklyn, New York. It was his first headlining tour.

Track listing
All tracks written and produced by Randy Findell; additional writers and producers are as indicated.

Note
 All tracks are stylized in lowercase.

Charts

References

2022 albums